In basketball, a steal is the act of legally gaining possession of the ball by a defensive player who causes the opponent to turn the ball over. The steal statistic was first compiled by the National Collegiate Athletic Association (NCAA) during the 1985–86 season. All of the players on this list have recorded 11 or more steals in a single game in NCAA Division I competition.

The all-time single game steals record holder is Daron "Mookie" Blaylock of Oklahoma, who twice recorded 13 steals. The first instance occurred on December 12, 1987 against Centenary, while the second instance happened nearly one year later to the day on December 17, 1988 against Loyola Marymount. Blaylock and Darron Brittman of Chicago State are the only two Division I players who have recorded at least 11 steals on two occasions. Chris Thomas of Notre Dame, meanwhile, is the only freshman to achieve the feat.

Key

Dates of 11+ steals

See also
List of National Basketball Association players with most steals in a game

References
General

Specific

NCAA Division I men's basketball statistical leaders